Wygoda  is a village in the administrative district of Gmina Pilawa, within Garwolin County, Masovian Voivodeship, in east-central Poland.

The village has an approximate population of 500.

References

Wygoda